Daughter of the Jungle is a 1949 American adventure film directed by George Blair and written by William Lively. The film stars Lois Hall, James Cardwell, William Wright, and Sheldon Leonard, with James Nolan, and Jim Bannon. The film was released on February 8, 1949, by Republic Pictures.

Plot
A small plane crash-lands in an African jungle. The pilot and his passengers – including a gangster and his accomplice who are being transported back to the USA in the custody of a government agent – encounter a missing millionaire and his Tarzan-like daughter, who tries to help the survivors get back to civilization.

Cast    
Lois Hall as Ticoora
James Cardwell as Paul Cooper
Sheldon Leonard as Dalton Kraik
James Nolan as Camser 
William Wright as Carl Easton
Jim Bannon as Kenneth Richards
George M. Carleton as Vincent Walker
Al Kikume as Native
Frank Lackteen as Mahorib
Francis McDonald as Montu
Alex Montoya as Tongo
Leo C. Richmond as Porter
Charles Soldani as Liongo

Critical reception
The film is included in the 1978 book The Fifty Worst Films of All Time by Harry Medved and Randy Dreyfuss.

References

External links 
 
 

1949 films
American adventure films
1949 adventure films
Republic Pictures films
Films directed by George Blair
American black-and-white films
1940s English-language films
1940s American films